Martin Høyland (born 17 September 1995) is a Norwegian football midfielder who plays for Sarpsborg 08.

A youth product of Våg FK, he started his senior career going back and forth between FK Vigør and Vindbjart FK. In the autumn of 2016 he moved up a tier to 2. divisjon team Grorud IL, where the former Våg and Vindbjart player Eirik Kjønø was manager. Høyland became a stalwart of the Grorud team that won promotion to, and survived in, the 2020 1. divisjon. In the summer of 2021 he moved to Stabæk Fotball, where Kjønø now had become manager. He made his Stabæk debut in the cup and his Eliteserien debut in August 2021 against Sarpsborg 08.

References

1995 births
Living people
Sportspeople from Kristiansand
Norwegian footballers
FK Vigør players
Vindbjart FK players
Grorud IL players
Stabæk Fotball players
Norwegian First Division players
Eliteserien players
Association football midfielders